Wayne Peters (born 4 June 1969) is a former Australian rules footballer who played with Richmond in the Victorian Football League (VFL).

Peters came to Richmond from Morwell, at pick 14 in the 1987 National Draft. He made his debut in round 21 of the 1988 VFL season, against Geelong at Kardinia Park. His other four league appearances all came in 1989.

References

External links
 
 

1969 births
Australian rules footballers from Victoria (Australia)
Living people
Morwell Football Club players
Richmond Football Club players